Kitsap Mall is an indoor shopping mall in Silverdale, Washington, United States. Its anchor tenants include JCPenney, Macy's, Dick's Sporting Goods, Kohl's, Barnes & Noble, Cost Plus World Market, and  WinCo Foods; it has 73 retail stores, and entertainment and dining establishments total. The mall is owned by Kitsap Mall LLC and managed by Jones Lang LaSalle.

History
After many years of planning, Kitsap Mall opened on August 1, 1985. As a result, the retail core of Kitsap County was shifted from Bremerton, Washington to the Silverdale area. The mall's original anchors were Lamonts, Sears, and The Bon Marché. In the coming decades, and after much success, Kitsap Mall nearly doubled in size, adding Mervyns on March 4, 1988, followed by JCPenney in 1989.
The Bon Marché was expanded to the east in 1993, nearly doubling its size. Meanwhile, Sears also underwent an expansion, as a result of establishing its standalone HomeLife furniture branch north of the mall in 1994 near the planned Bon Marché Furniture Gallery next to the NorthPoint at Kitsap strip mall, a satellite shopping center developed by Winmar.

In September 2000, Lamonts became Gottschalks after the latter's acquisition of the former in a bankruptcy sale earlier that year. The Bon Marché was re-branded under the Macy's name plate, first as Bon-Macy's in 2003, becoming Macy's in 2005.
In 2006, Kitsap Mall received a big change as Gottschalks closed down. 
The building which housed Gottschalks was torn down and replaced by a new building, which now houses Barnes & Noble and Cost Plus World Market. 
In 2007, Mervyns closed its Silverdale location, a precursor to the chain's eventual demise in the coming year. It has since been replaced by a new building for Kohl's, which opened on November 11, 2007. 2008 featured the opening of the region's first Hollister store in November, replacing the former Disney Store. Remodelling of the mall's façade and interior was performed in 2011 through 2012.

In June 2013, Kitsap Mall and its surrounding properties (NorthPoint at Kitsap, Kitsap Place) were bought by Starwood Capital Group from Macerich for around $127 million, of which nearly $77 million was from a loan taken from the Royal Bank of Scotland. Revitalization of the mall soon followed, with the addition of Buffalo Wild Wings to the dormant food court, a relocated Victoria's Secret coinciding with the debut of its PINK store, and a newly-built H&M throughout 2015. Dick's Sporting Goods was added as an anchor store in 2016.

On August 22, 2019, it was reported that Sears would be closing its store and auto center at Kitsap Mall following the recent sale of its property. The closure came as a surprise, an unannounced addition to a simultaneous round of store closings in Washington state and nationwide. The store closed on October 20, 2019 after nearly 35 years at the mall.

On May 26, 2021, it was reported that the Kitsap Mall would be sold at a foreclosure auction on August 27 of that year. The original satellite properties, NorthPoint and Kitsap Place, were divested of earlier in the year, preceding the mall's foreclosure. On the day of the planned auction, the auctioneer announced that it would be postponed to September 24. Following the delay, the Kitsap County Assessor appraised the property at $34.5 million against a debt of $74.56 million.

U.S. Bank, which held the loan defaulted on by the owner of the Kitsap Mall, will gain ownership after it was the sole bidder at the mall's foreclosure auction on December 17, 2021.

On August 22, 2022, WinCo Foods, opened in the space formerly occupied by Sears.

References

External links
Kitsap Mall Official Site
"Kitsap Mall has new owner"

Buildings and structures in Kitsap County, Washington
Shopping malls in Washington (state)
Shopping malls established in 1985
Tourist attractions in Kitsap County, Washington
1985 establishments in Washington (state)